Kim Bada (born October 21, 1971) is a South Korean singer, musician, producer, and songwriter. His birth name is Kim Jung-nam (김정남). From 1995 to 1999, he was the fifth vocalist of Korean rock band Sinawe. In 2003, he formed the rock band Butterfly Effect, which disbanded in 2007. That same year, he became the vocalist of The Ratios, an electronic rock band. In 2009, Kim formed Art Of Parties, and in 2013 released his first solo album, N.Surf part 1.

Sinawe 

Kim became the fifth vocalist of legendary heavy metal/rock band Sinawe, formed by guitarist Shin Daechul, son of Shin Junghyeon, in October 1995. His first release with them was the 1996 mini album Circus. He holds the record for the longest-serving vocalist of the band to date.

Music 
While Butterfly Effect focused on modern rock and The Ratios on electronic rock, Art Of Parties experiments with garage, alternative, modern and psychedelic rock.

Nicknamed 'The Maestro of Rock Vocalists,' Kim is known for his unchanging expression while he performs.

Kim is a songwriter and producer, having written songs since his time with Sinawe. In 2013, he participated in producing and directing JYJ's Kim Jaejoong's solo mini album.

In 2010, he was a professor in the department of applied music at Seoul Arts College. In 2012, he reunited with Sinawe to participate in MBC's I Am a Singer 2. From 2013 to 2014, he also appeared on KBS's Immortal Songs 2.

Personal life 

Kim is married to fashion designer Lee Juyoung, who has designed pieces for Lady Gaga, The Black Eyed Peas and Marilyn Manson.

Discography

Sinawe 
 Circus (1996)
 은퇴선언 (1997)
 Psychedelos (1998)

Butterfly Effect 
 Butterfly Effect (2003)
 Butterfly Effect 2nd (2005)
 Digital Single – Shooting Star / What A Girl (2006)
 Digital Single – Candy (2007)

The Ratios 
 Burning Telepathy (2008)
 Lusty Initialization (2013)

Art Of Parties 
 Ophelia (2010)
 Seitrap Fo Tra (2011)
 Reborn (2011)
 Digital Single – Island / Never Ever (2012)

Solo 
 N.Surf part 1 (2013)
 Moonage Dream (2014)

Soundtracks 
 18 vs. 29 O.S.T. – "If Only Once" (2005)
 Miss Korea O.S.T. – "Heartbreaker (With Every Single Day)" (2014)

Featurings 
 Leessang's Hexagonal – "Dying Freedom" (2009)
 Romantic Punch's Midnight Cinderella – "Right Now" (2010)
 Novasonic's Home – Sad Clown (2001)
 Rainy Sun's Origin- Black Dog (2009)
 Noise Cat's Sunday Sunset Airlines – "Playing With Sunday" (2012)

References

External links 
  Art Of Parties Cafe 
 Bada Kim's Twitter
 Bada Kim's Facebook

1971 births
Living people
South Korean singer-songwriters
21st-century South Korean singers

pt:Bada Kim

zh:Bada Kim